Dubai College (DC) is a selective entry British school in Dubai, United Arab Emirates. Established in 1978, the school caters for students in Years 7 to 13, and is situated in the Al Sufouh area of Dubai. Students prepare for the British GCSE and A-Level examinations. It is a not for profit organisation, and is administered by a board of governors, currently chaired by British chartered accountant, Edward Quinlan.

Dubai College is widely considered one of the UAE's most prestigious schools. In the 2014 COBIS survey of its member schools, Dubai College had the best examination results of all British School Overseas in the world.

The Headmaster, and the school, is a member of the HMC, COBIS and British Schools of the Middle East.

History
Dubai College was founded in 1978 under an Emiri decree issued by the late Ruler of Dubai, Sheikh Rashid bin Saeed Al Maktoum, with the now famous instruction: "Build us a school, here".

Before the school moved to its current location, it was housed in two small villas near Safa Park. Dubai College started its first year with five teachers and twenty two pupils.

The Board of Governors set up a debenture system and arranged bank loans to fund a permanent building for the school. The contracted architectural firm was Brewer, Smith and Brewer.
In 1979, the first school building, now dubbed A Block, was constructed.

After some years of absence, the school has reintroduced a compulsory debenture system, payable for all new pupils entering the school from September 2015.

Dubai College was selected to host the COBIS Secondary Games 2016.

Academics
In 2019, Dubai College's GCSE performance was comparable to the 5th best UK co-educational independent school. Their excellent A Level results mean that up to 52% of Dubai College leavers now go on to study at the top 1% of universities worldwide and they are yet again the top performing school in the United Arab Emirates achieving 90% A*/A grades at GCSE and 61% A*/A grades at A Level this year.

KHDA Inspection Report

The Knowledge and Human Development Authority (KHDA) is an educational quality assurance authority based in Dubai, United Arab Emirates. It undertakes early learning, school and higher learning institution management and rates them as well.

A summary of the inspection ratings for Dubai College.

A summary of all the schools in Dubai's ratings can be found at KHDA School Ratings.

Enrolment
With a predominant reputation in the United Arab Emirates, Dubai College is a popular and highly selective choice. It receives about 450 applicants a year for only 160 spaces. It has approximately 950 students and more than 100 members of teaching staff.

School Fees
The school fees for 2018-2019 are AED 80,808 for Year 7 to Year 11 and AED 91,503 for Year 12 and Year 13. A Personal Debenture is required for all new students joining the school to the value of AED 25,000, which will be returned less any outstanding sums owing when the student leaves.

Campus

The campus of Dubai College offers many facilities such as a large sports field with rugby pitches, football pitches, a cricket pitch and cricket nets as well as astroturf tennis courts  and netball courts. There are also 3 Design and Technology workshops, a Music Centre with a recording studio, and a specialised Art department. The school has 5 computer suites, with internet access.

A new 950-seat auditorium began construction in 2007, and was opened in 2009. A Wi-Fi network was implemented into the Sixth Form centre in 2010 and the entire school in 2011.

The school has recently built a Sports Pavilion. In 2018 the school opened a new Reception Building and a Teaching and Learning Centre.

Student Body
As of 2018 there were 951 students, with 50% originating from British families and the remainder from other foreign nationalities.

Extracurricular Activities
Over 130 extracurricular activities are participated in by Dubai College students including the Duke of Edinburgh's Award, and F1 in Schools.

Athletics
Dubai College students annually partake in the 'Fab 5' athletics tournament, competing against other schools in the area. The college also competes in athletic competitions on a regular basis at Rashid School for Boys. The school also participates in the annual British Schools in the Middle East Games.

Debating
Dubai College is considered one of the leading schools for Debating in Dubai. They have successfully competed at various international and regional Debate tournaments and competitions, including the British Schools of the Middle East Debating Tournament, Debate Dubai, Cambridge Union Schools Debating Competition and COBIS Student World Debate Competition. Students from the school have also been selected to represent the UAE at the World Schools Debating Championship.

Rugby
Dubai College annually hosts the Dubai College Rugby 7's, and the Dubai College Rugby 10's tournaments. School teams from all over the United Arab Emirates and from the Persian Gulf are invited, and all the proceeds go to charity. Regular participants include The English College, Doha College, and Jumeirah College.

Dubai College also participates in the Gulf Under 18 Men section of the Dubai Sevens, and in an annual tour of Hong Kong preceding the Hong Kong Sevens.

F1 in Schools
In 2010 Dubai College participated in the F1 in Schools competition. Out of four Dubai College representative teams, Team Impulse won the UAE National Finals, and went on to represent the United Arab Emirates in the International Finals in Singapore. They won the Outstanding sportsmanship award.
In the 2011 F1 in Schools UAE National Championships, two teams from Dubai College were entered, Team RedShift and Revolution Racing. Revolution Racing came 2nd overall, which means they will collaborate with a Malaysian team and compete in the world finals. Team RedShift won the Best Verbal Presentation award, as well as being named the 2011 F1 in Schools UAE National Champions. 
In 2017 Dubai College again participated in the F1 in Schools competition represented by only one team, Team Velocity. Team Velocity won the Best Verbal Presentation award and came 3rd overall.

Golf
Students from Dubai College annually create a workforce of over 100 people from years 9 and 10 to perform scoring duties at the Dubai Ladies Masters and the Dubai Desert Classic. They have also been scorers at the DP World Tour Championship, Dubai, the season-ending event of the European Tour.

Controversies

Resignation of the Headmaster
In 2009, schools in Dubai were subject to inspection by the KHDA, who separated schools into one of four categories; Outstanding, Good, Acceptable and Unsatisfactory. The assessments sparked significant controversy, partly because of the decision to link tuition increases to the results of the inspections. Outstanding schools were allowed fee increases by 15%, Good schools by 12%, Acceptable schools by 10%, and Unsatisfactory schools by 7%, diverging from the previous uniform allowance of an 8% increase each year.

The then headmaster of Dubai College, Dr. Carlo Ferrario, subsequently announced his resignation, citing government interference in the school's operations as the chief reason.

In a letter sent to parents of students, Ferrario was critical of the school inspections launched in the previous year, and said he would depart at the end of the academic year because of significant changes in the "educational landscape".
"Over the past two years this has changed markedly, with the level of intervention from external agencies ... reaching levels that, in my view, compromise [the school’s] independence," Ferrario said in the letter. "While school inspection is important and I applaud it, I believe the system of inspection that has been adopted in Dubai presents more disadvantages than benefits for schools like Dubai College," he said. "It is not a regime with which I feel able to work."

Dubai College was given a result of Good, the second highest rating, in both the 2009 and 2010 inspections.

Ralph Tabberer, the chief of schools at Global Education Management Systems, said of Ferrario; "Carlo Ferrario is an outstanding educator, so we need to take notice of his comments on inspections. They are supposed to drive out the weak, not the strong". The owner of GEMS Education, Sunny Varkey, has also been critical of the inspections.

Fraud by Accountant Employee
The theft took place over 16 months, beginning in June 2010.

The fraudster was ordered to repay the  he had stolen from the school, as well as being ordered to serve a 5-year prison sentence. As of March 2021 the employee has not been found, nor has the money been recovered.

Notable alumni
Andrew Chetcuti, Maltese Olympic swimmer
Tom Weston-Jones, Actor
Dinuk Wijeratne, Musician Symphony Nova Scotia
Ed Jones, IndyCar driver
Omar Daair, British High Commissioner to Rwanda and Ambassador-Designate to Burundi

Gallery

References

External Links 
Dubai College - school website
Schools in Dubai - comprehensive list of private schools in Dubai and the UAE

Educational institutions established in 1978
British international schools in Dubai
International schools in Dubai
1978 establishments in the United Arab Emirates